Franz Liszt International Piano Competition in Budapest is a long-standing competition founded by the Office of International Music Competitions in Budapest as one of 17 competitions under the flagship name of "Budapest International Music Competition."  The Franz Liszt International Piano Competition debuted in 1933 under the leadership of Ernő Dohnányi of the Franz Liszt Academy of Music, where the competition was held.

Franz Liszt International Piano Competition (1933–) 
The Liszt Piano Competition started in 1933, but had a hiatus from 1937 to 1956. The competition takes place in 5-years cycles (1956, 1961, 1966, etc.).
In the year 2006, the competition repertoire was from Liszt and Bartók.
Year 2011 competition's repertoire was solely of Liszt again – due to Liszt's 200th birth anniversary.

Winners

Prize winners
 1956: Valerie Tryon (born 1934)
 1933: Andor Foldes

Winners, year not known
 Vlastimil Lejsek (1927–2010)

See also 
 World Federation of International Music Competitions

Other piano competitions by the same name 
 International Franz Liszt Piano Competition, Utrecht, Netherlands (founded in 1986)
 International Franz Liszt Piano Competition, Weimar, Germany
 Franz Liszt Piano Competition, Town Hall, New York City (held only one year, in 1960)
 International Franz Liszt Piano Competition, Mario Zanfi Prize, Parma Conservatoire, Italy (founded 1981, held every four years)

References 

Piano competitions
International Piano Competition Budapest
Hungarian music awards